Greg Osby (born August 3, 1960) is an American saxophonist and composer.

Biography
Born in St. Louis, Missouri, Osby studied at Howard University, then at the Berklee College of Music. He moved to New York City in 1982, where he played with Jaki Byard, Jim Hall, Muhal Richard Abrams, Andrew Hill, Jack DeJohnette, Dizzy Gillespie, and Herbie Hancock. In 1985, he joined DeJohnette's group Special Edition. With Geri Allen, Steve Coleman, Gary Thomas, and Cassandra Wilson, he was a founding member of the M-Base Collective.

Osby began recording albums under his own name for JMT Records in the mid-1980s, then signed with Blue Note in 1989. In 2007, he formed his own label, Inner Circle Music. He gave exposure to young pianist Jason Moran, who appeared on most of Osby's 1990s albums, including Further Ado, Zero, Banned in New York and Symbols of Light, a double quartet featuring the addition of a string quartet to the band.

He has also played with Phil Lesh and Friends, and he has toured with the Dead, a reincarnation of the Grateful Dead. He received the Playboy Magazine Jazz Artist of the Year award for 2004 and 2009.

Nate Chinen, writing for The New York Times, called Osby "a mentor and a pacesetter, one of the sturdier bridges between jazz generations," and stated that he has "a keen, focused tone on alto saxophone and a hummingbird's phrasing, an equilibrium of hover and flutter."

Discography

As leader

As sideman 

With Franco Ambrosetti
 Movies Too (Enja, 1988)
 Music for Symphony and Jazz Band (Enja, 1991) – recorded in 1990

With Uri Caine
 Cipher Syntax (JMT, 1989) as Strata Institute
 The Goldberg Variations (Winter & Winter, 2000)

With Gary Thomas
 By Any Means Necessary (JMT, 1989)
 Pariah's Pariah (Winter & Winter, 1998)

With Andrew Hill
 1989: Eternal Spirit (Blue Note, 1989)
 1990: But Not Farewell (Blue Note, 1991)

With others
 Cecil Brooks III, The Collective (Muse, 1989)
 Terri Lyne Carrington, Structure (ACT Music, 2004)
 Steve Coleman, Drop Kick (Novus, 1992)
 Andrew Cyrille, Low Blue Flame (Tum, 2006) – recorded in 2005
 Robin Eubanks, Karma (JMT, 1991)
 Jimmy Herring, Lifeboat (Abstract Logix, 2008)
 Jason Moran, Soundtrack to Human Motion (Blue Note, 1999) – recorded in 1998
 Tineke Postma, Sonic Halo (Challenge Records, 2014)
 Project Z, Lincoln Memorial (Abstract Logix, 2005) – recorded in 2002
 Sam Rivers' Rivbea All-star Orchestra, Culmination (BMG France, 1999)

References

External links
  – official site

1960 births
Living people
Musicians from St. Louis
Howard University alumni
Berklee College of Music alumni
American jazz saxophonists
American male saxophonists
African-American musicians
African-American jazz musicians
African-American saxophonists
Avant-garde jazz saxophonists
Free funk saxophonists
Jazz saxophonists
21st-century American saxophonists
Jazz musicians from Missouri
21st-century American male musicians
American male jazz musicians
JMT Records artists
Blue Note Records artists
Nagel-Heyer Records artists